The simple station Patio Bonito is part of the TransMilenio mass-transit system of Bogotá, Colombia, which opened in the year 2000.

Location 
The station is located in southwestern Bogotá, specifically on Avenida Ciudad de Cali with Calles 38B and 40B Sur.

It serves the El Rosario, Corabastos, La Concorida, and Patio Bonito neighborhoods.

History 
In May 2004, the Avenida de Las Américas line was extended along Avenida Ciudad de Cali. This station was included in that extension.

The station is named Patio Bonito due to the neighborhood of the same name to its west.

Station services

Old trunk services

Main line service

Feeder routes

Inter-city service

See also 
 Bogotá
 TransMilenio
 List of TransMilenio stations

External links 
 TransMilenio

TransMilenio